Edwin Binney (November 24, 1866 – December 17, 1934) was an American entrepreneur and inventor, who created the first dustless white chalk, and along with his cousin C. Harold Smith (born London, 1860 - died, 1931), was the founder of handicrafts company "Binney and Smith", which marketed his invention of the Crayola crayon. The Binney family lived in Old Greenwich, Connecticut, as well as Fort Pierce, Florida.

Biography 
Binney was born in Shrub Oak, New York. In 1866, he took control of his father's business, Peekskill Chemical Co. While experimenting with a mixture of slate waste, cement, and talc, Binney created the first dustless white chalk. The invention was awarded a gold medal at the St. Louis World's Fair in 1904. Co-founding the firm "Binney & Smith", he produced the first box of 'Crayola' crayons in 1903. His wife created the portmanteau name of the brand by combining elements of two words: craie (French for "chalk") and ola for "oleaginou" or "oily", since the crayons were made using a petroleum based wax. 

In 1902, Binney and Smith had already invented a new wax crayon used to mark crates and barrels, but it was loaded with carbon black and too toxic for use by children. They were confident that the pigment and wax mixing techniques they had developed could be adapted to make safe wax crayons in a variety of colors. Binney also put forward the idea of black tires, again using carbon black, which strengthens the rubber and makes it more thermally conductive.

Around 1911, Binney began spending more time in southeastern Florida, as he was an avid fisherman, and the family soon began to winter there after purchasing a large acreage north of the city of Fort Pierce, Florida.

Binney was a community activist. He was responsible for Fort Pierce becoming a port city in 1921, funding a channel to be cut across Hutchinson Island. In 1929, he helped to keep the St. Lucie County Bank from succumbing to the poor economic conditions prevalent at that time. Their land holding was called Fort Pierce Farms, but wife Alice renamed it (again, with a portmanteau) "Indrio", from Indian (for the nearby Indian River) and rio (Spanish for river).

Personal life-home
Binney was married to Alice Stead Binney (1866-1960), a London school teacher.  They had four children: Dorothy Binney, Helen Binney Kitchel, Mary, and Edwin Jr. Their daughter Helen became a four-time member of the Connecticut legislature. Their daughter Mary married a tree surgeon, James A.G. Davey. Their son Edwin Jr was an international swimmer and Professor at Yale.

References

1866 births
1934 deaths
American arts and crafts industry businesspeople
19th-century American inventors
20th-century American inventors
Businesspeople from New York (state)
Crayola
People from Yorktown, New York
Engineers from New York (state)